NGC 3925 is a barred lenticular galaxy and a ring galaxy located about 370 million light-years away in the constellation Leo. It was discovered by astronomer Heinrich d'Arrest on February 19, 1863. 

NGC 3925 is classified as a "PAS galaxy" because it contains mostly old stars, with no observable star formation activity. NGC 3925 is also a member of the Coma Supercluster.

See also
List of NGC objects (3001–4000)
Coma Supercluster

References

External links

3925
037078
Leo (constellation)
Astronomical objects discovered in 1863
Barred lenticular galaxies
Ring galaxies
Coma Supercluster